Sinum bifasciatum is a species of predatory sea snail, a marine gastropod mollusk in the family Naticidae, the moon snails.

Description
The size of an adult shell varies between 18 mm and 40 mm.

Distribution
This species occurs in the Mediterranean Sea, in the Atlantic Ocean along the Canary Islands, Cape Verdes, Morocco, West Africa and Angola,

References

 Weinkauff H.C. (1883). Die Gattung Sigaretus. [in] Systematisches Conchylien-Cabinet von Martini und Chemnitz, 2nd ed. (Küster H.C., ed.). 6(1)[(2)]: 1-50, pl. A, 1-10.
 Bernard, P.A. (Ed.) (1984). Coquillages du Gabon [Shells of Gabon]. Pierre A. Bernard: Libreville, Gabon. 140, 75 plates pp.
 Gofas, S.; Afonso, J.P.; Brandào, M. (Ed.). (S.a.). Conchas e Moluscos de Angola = Coquillages et Mollusques d'Angola. [Shells and molluscs of Angola]. Universidade Agostinho / Elf Aquitaine Angola: Angola. 140 pp.
 Gofas, S.; Le Renard, J.; Bouchet, P. (2001). Mollusca, in: Costello, M.J. et al. (Ed.) (2001). European register of marine species: a check-list of the marine species in Europe and a bibliography of guides to their identification. Collection Patrimoines Naturels, 50: pp. 180–213
 Rolán E., 2005. Malacological Fauna From The Cape Verde Archipelago. Part 1, Polyplacophora and Gastropoda.
 Torigoe K. & Inaba A. (2011). Revision on the classification of Recent Naticidae. Bulletin of the Nishinomiya Shell Museum. 7: 133 + 15 pp., 4 pls.

External links
 
 Récluz, C. A. (1851). Catalogue des espèces du genre Sigaret (Sigaretus Lk). Journal de Conchyliologie. 2: 163-191, pl. 6
 Dunker, W. (1853). Index molluscorum, quae in itinere ad Guineam inferiorem collegit Georgius Tams Med. Dr.. Cassel, Th. Fischer, vi + 74 pp., 10 pl

Naticidae
Gastropods described in 1851
Molluscs of the Atlantic Ocean
Molluscs of the Mediterranean Sea
Molluscs of the Canary Islands
Molluscs of Angola
Gastropods of Cape Verde
Invertebrates of Gabon
Invertebrates of North Africa